Microcotylidae is a family of polyopisthocotylean monogeneans. All the species in this family are parasitic on fish.

Subfamilies
According to the World Register of Marine Species,  the family includes 7 subfamilies:

 Anchoromicrocotylinae Bravo-Hollis, 1981 
 Atriasterinae Maillard & Noisy, 1979  including Sparicotyle chrysophrii
 Metamicrocotylinae Yamaguti, 1963 
 Microcotylinae Taschenberg, 1879  including Microcotyle with many species.
 Prosomicrocotylinae Yamaguti, 1963 
 Prostatomicrocotylinae Yamaguti, 1968   
 Syncoelicotylinae Mamaev & Zubchenko, 1978

References

 
Polyopisthocotylea
Platyhelminthes families